John Edward "Doc" Dorman (c. 1878 – February 2, 1963) was an American football and basketball coach.  He was the head football coach at Upper Iowa University in Fayette, Iowa from roughly 1905 until his retirement in 1959.

Dorman graduated from Upper Iowa in 1900. During his years as a student at UIU, he played football, basketball and baseball. Upon graduation from UIU, he entered Georgetown University where he received his DDS.  While there, he played baseball, receiving offers from several major leagues; but he chose to return to Fayette where he went into his father's dental office. In the spring of 1907, he began a coaching career at UIU that lasted over 50 years.

In 1955, Dr. Dorman received an achievement award from the Football Writers Association of America. The following year he was named to the Helms Athletic Foundation Hall of Fame. He was the first small-college coach to be honored by either group.

Head coaching record

Football

References

Year of birth missing
1870s births
1963 deaths
Upper Iowa Peacocks athletic directors
Upper Iowa Peacocks baseball coaches
Upper Iowa Peacocks football coaches
Upper Iowa Peacocks men's basketball coaches
Upper Iowa University alumni
People from Fayette County, Iowa